Searchlight is a 1989 album, the sixth by Scottish Celtic rock band Runrig.

Track listing
All songs written by Calum Macdonald and Rory Macdonald. 
 "News from Heaven" - 3:36
 "Every River" - 4:46
 "City of Lights" - 4:25
 "Èirinn" (Ireland) - 4:55
 "Tìr A' Mhurain" (Land of the Marram Grass) - 3:54
 "World Appeal" - 2:20
 "Tear Down These Walls" - 4:08
 "Only the Brave" - 3:58
 "Sìol Ghoraidh" (The Genealogy of Goraidh) - 5:21
 "That Final Mile" - 3:07
 "Smalltown" - 4:02
 "Precious Years" - 4:46

Personnel
Runrig
Iain Bayne - drums, percussion
Malcolm Jones - guitars, mandolin, accordion
Calum Macdonald - percussion
Rory Macdonald - vocals, bass guitar
Donnie Munro - lead vocals
Peter Wishart - keyboards

References

Runrig albums
1989 albums
Scottish Gaelic music